Skarphéðinn Njálsson was a semi-legendary Icelander who may have lived in the 10th century. He is known as a character in  Njáls saga, a medieval Icelandic saga which describes a process of blood feuds. The saga is now believed to have been composed in Iceland during the period from 1270 to 1290.  

The eldest son of Njáll Þorgeirsson and Bergþóra Skarphéðinsdóttir,  he grew up at Bergþórshvoll in Rangárvallasýsla. The saga describes a series of feuds involving friends of Njáll and later also Njáll and his sons. Skarphéðinn is described as hardy and skilled warrior but also as an ill-tempered and sharp tongued man whose insults of potential allies at the althing ends up isolating the Njáll and his family, leading to their demise as they are burned by their enemies inside their home at Bergþórshvoll.

Biography
At first the feud is fueled by the anger of Hallgerður Höskuldsdóttir, wife of Njáll's friend Gunnarr, who is slighted when Njáll's wife Bergthora asks her to move away from the main table at a banquet. Hallgerd goads some of her servants to attack members of Njáll's household and Bergþóra in turn convinces some of hers to retaliate. Eventually, the Njálls' foster father Þórður Ieysingjason is killed, and dying he predicts that he will be avenged by Skarphéðinn, pulling him into the conflict. After years of intermittent feuding, Skarphéðinn causes the tide of the conflict to turn against Njáll and his family, when he kills the well-liked and innocent Höskuldr Þráinsson the priest (goði) of Hvítanes as he is sowing his field. Þráinsson is the son of Þráinn Sigfússon, who had been killed by Skarphéðinn, but taken as a foster child by Njáll. The apparently senseless act is widely condemned by members of Icelandic society, and Skarphéðinn even himself admits that it gave him an ill-reputation.

Skarphéðinn is described as a large and dangerous looking man of threatening demeanor, with prominent teeth and an ugly mouth, whose facial expression often betrays a burning rage that he is working hard to keep under control. Having been burned in the house with his father and brothers, his friends find his charred body with his eyes open and teeth biting down on his lips - and they agree that he is now less scary to them than when he was alive. He carried a long axe named Rimmugýgur, which before his death he drove into a wooden beam of the house as it was burning down, probably  to preserve its sharp edge, in order for it to be used later in avenging him. He has been interpreted as a monstrous character due to the way that he affects people around him, instilling fear by his mere presence.

Notes

Works Cited

 

10th-century Icelandic people